Pongi Varum Kaveri is a 1989 Indian Tamil-language film produced by P. L. Palaniappan Chettiar and directed by T. K. Bose, starring Ramarajan and Gautami.

Cast

Ramarajan
Gautami
Manorama
S. S. Chandran
Malaysia Vasudevan
Disco Shanti
Vinu Chakravarthy
K. Natraj
Sripriya
Kovai Sarala
Chinni Jayanth
Kumarimuthu
Omakuchi Narasimhan
Radha Ravi

Soundtrack
Soundtrack was composed by Ilaiyaraaja and lyrics were written by Gangai Amaran and Piraisoodan. In particular, the song 'Velli Kolusu' was a big hit.

References

1989 films
Films scored by Ilaiyaraaja
1980s Tamil-language films